Glenea mephisto is a species of beetle in the family Cerambycidae. It was described by James Thomson in 1879.

References

mephisto
Beetles described in 1879